Underbelly: Razor, the fourth series of the Australian Nine Network crime drama anthology series Underbelly, originally aired from 21 August 2011 to 6 November 2011. It is a thirteen-part series detailing real events that occurred in Sydney between 1927 and 1936. The series depicts the "razor gangs" who controlled the city's underworld during the era and the violent war between the two "vice queen" powers, Tilly Devine and Kate Leigh. It is also the last season in the Underbelly franchise that contains 13 episodes. In contrast to the previous Underbelly instalments, which were based on books by John Silvester and Andrew Rule, Razor is based on the Ned Kelly Award-winning book of the same name, written by Larry Writer.

Synopsis 
Razor is set during the "Roaring Twenties" and 1930s, mainly between 1927 and 1936 in Sydney, when organised crime in Australia became more prominent. The series details the story of the bloody battle between the era's most feared "vice queens", Tilly Devine and her rival Kate Leigh, plus the "razor gangs" which controlled the Sydney underworld during that time. Embroiled in the violence is the country's young police force and a young girl called Nellie Cameron, determined to lose her innocence and destined to become the most famous prostitute in the land.

Episodes

Cast

Main cast 
 Danielle Cormack as Kate Leigh, rival of the Devines and sly grog queen
 Chelsie Preston Crayford as Tilly Devine, brothel madam
 Anna McGahan as Nellie Cameron, a notorious prostitute embroiled in the violence of the era
 Jack Campbell as "Big Jim" Devine, Tilly Devine's husband
 John Batchelor as Wally Tomlinson, business associate and boyfriend of Kate Leigh
 Khan Chittenden as Frank "The Little Gunman" Green, notorious criminal and assassin
 Richard Brancatisano as Guido Calletti, feared gangland figure and Nellie Cameron's first husband
 Craig Hall as Detective Inspector Bill Mackay, part of the country's young police force
 Lucy Wigmore as Lillian May Armfield, one of Australia's first policewomen
 Steve Le Marquand as Sergeant Tom Wickham, a member of New South Wales' first drug "squad"

Recurring and guest cast 
 Jeremy Lindsay Taylor as Norman Bruhn, the era's most feared standover man
 Justin Rosniak as Leslie "Squizzy" Taylor, Bruhn's Melbourne-based rival
 Felix Williamson as Phil "The Jew" Jeffs, infamous gangster
 Lincoln Lewis as Bruce Higgs, associate and lover of Kate Leigh
 Pippa Grandison as Mona Woods, singer at one of Kate Leigh's sly-grog shops
 Catherine Glavicic as May Seckold, an employee of Kate Leigh.
 Conrad Coleby as Constable Wharton "Syd" Thompson, the other half of Sydney's first drug squad
 Guy Edmonds as Greg "The Gunman" Gaffney, an associate of vice-queen Kate Leigh
 David Willis as Bill "The Octopus" Flanagan, an associate of Kate Leigh
 Rel Hunt as William Archer, bathhouse proprietor and part of the razor gangs
 Matt Boesenberg as John "Snowy" Cutmore, standover man
 Adam Tuominen as Frank "Razor Jack" Hayes, member of Bruhn's gang
 Pacharo Mzembe as "Nigger", a gangster.  (Redubbed "Nugget" for the Underbelly: Razor – Uncut DVD release).
 Jessica Mauboy as Gloria Starr, the Fifty-Fifty Club singer
 Rob Mills as Eric Connolly, a jazz club singer
 Saskia Burmeister as Ida Maddocks, the main rape victim and primary witness in "the Darlinghurst Outrage" case
 Emily Rose Brennan as "Black" Aggie, one of Tilly Devine's prostitutes. Begins a relationship with Greg "The Gunman" Gaffney
 Rick Donald as Barney Dalton, rugby player employed by Kate Leigh and murdered by Frank Green.
 Guy Spence as Sid "Kicker" Kelly, hardened criminal and one half of the Kelly brothers
 Clint Foster as Tom Kelly, the other half of the Kelly brothers
 Caleb Alloway as Constable Keith Sullivan, crime fighter
 T.J. Power as H. L Jones, news reporter
 Anna Lawrence as Irene Bruhn, wife of Norman Bruhn
 Tasman and Rex Palazzi as Noel and Keith Bruhn, toddler sons of Norman Bruhn
 Grant Garland as Charles Connors, gangster and 'razor-man'
 Izzy Stevens as Eileen Leigh, daughter of Kate Leigh
 Jamie Kristian as Albert Duke, Englishman and husband of Eileen Leigh
 Troy Planet as George "The Midnight Raper" Wallace, violent member of Bruhn's gang
 Jake Ryan as Constable Ray "The Blizzard" Blissett, crusading policeman
 Felix Jozeps as Ernest Wilson, Phil Jeffs' driver and gangster
 Kim Knuckey as Fred Moffitt, taxi driver
 Rachel Rowlatt as Phyllis, housekeeper of the Devines
 Adele Vuko as Gwynnie, a prostitute working for Tilly Devine
 Kelly Anderson as Peg, a prostitute working for Tilly Devine
 Ben Purser as Herbert "Pal" Brown, Kate Leigh's short-lived lieutenant
 Larry Writer as TBA, a wealthy businessman who frequents Kate Leigh's nightclubs
 Daniel Matthew Beltran as Percy Cook, member of Guido Calletti's gang
 James Pope as John "Snowy" Prendergast, aspiring razor gang member
 Ky Baldwin as Eddie "the Urchin", lookout and messenger for Leigh
 Don Rogers as Edward Brady, small-time criminal
 William Upjohn as Roy the Butcher, a butcher and barman for one of Kate Leigh's sly grog shops
 Will Ward as Ralph the Barman, barkeep for the tavern frequented by most of the razor gangs
 Mehmet Yanuz as Rabbitoh, Rabbit peddler
 Arianwen Parkes-Lockwood as Dolly Green, wife of Frank "The Little Gunman" Green
 Lizzie Schebesta as Guido Calletti's moll Dulcie Markham
 David Roberts as Frank de Groot, leader of the New Guard
 Jessica De Gouw as Constable Edie McElroy, one of the first policewomen after Lillian Armfield
 Jim Holt as Thomas Bavin, New South Wales premier
 Graeme Blundell as Jack Lang, infamous NSW premier

Ratings 
The premiere episode made Razor the highest rating drama in Australian history, surpassing the record set by Underbelly: A Tale of Two Cities.

References 

2011 Australian television series debuts
2011 Australian television series endings
2011 Australian television seasons
APRA Award winners
2010s Australian crime television series
2010s Australian drama television series
2010s Australian television miniseries
Nine Network original programming
Television series set in the 1920s
Television series set in the 1930s
Television shows set in New South Wales
Organised crime in Sydney